Goodramgate is a street in the city centre of York, in England.

History
The area now covered by Goodramgate lay within the walls of Roman Eboracum.  The street runs diagonally across the line of former Roman buildings, from the Porta Decumana (now King's Square) to the Porta Principalis Sinistra (now Monk Bar).  Anglo-Saxon artifacts have been found in the area, while its name dates from the Viking Jorvik era, being named after someone called "Guthrum" or "Gutherun".

The street was first recorded in about 1180.  In the Mediaeval period, the street lay in the parish of Holy Trinity Church, although since 1316 the church has been hidden from the street, behind Lady Row.  The precinct of York Minster lay immediately north of the street, and until the early 19th-century, was entered through a gateway.  Part of this may survive in the rebuilt structure at the entrance to College Street.  The original site of the York Dominican Friary may have been on the street, although it moved to Toft Green in 1227.  By this time, the street contained some large, stone, houses, associated with wealthy merchants.

Many Mediaeval buildings survive on the street, although some were destroyed when its south-western end was widened in 1771, or when Deangate was constructed in 1906.  Several non-conformist churches have existed on the street, including the Methodist Monk Bar Chapel, while the former Lecture Hall was used by Baptists and then Presbyterians.  Sanderson's Temperance Hotel, later the Victoria Hotel, was used by the Swedenborgians and the Primitive Methodists.

The street has long been a centre for retail, with a market created in 1502 for beds, mattresses and upholstery.  It is now lined with shops, bars and restaurants, including two small supermarkets built in the 1960s.

Layout and architecture

The street runs north-east from the northern tip of King's Square, where it meets Church Street and Low Petergate, to Monk Bar on the York city walls, beyond which its continuation is Monkgate.  College Green lies off the north-western side of the street, where it meets Deangate and College Street.  Ogleforth and the snickelway Monk Bar Court also lead off the north-western side, while Aldwark, Bedern, and Powells Yard lead off the south-eastern side.

Notable buildings on the south-east side of the street include 13, 15, 17, 23, and 25 Goodramgate, all with 16th-century origins; 31 and 33 Goodramgate, also of Mediaeval origin; the 15th-century 41–45 Goodramgate; The Snickleway Inn and Wealden Hall; and the 17th-century 53 Goodramgate.  On the north-west side, they include Lady Row, with Holy Trinity Church behind; 6–10, and 12 Goodramgate, both with 17th-century origins; The Royal Oak and The Golden Slipper, both with 15th-century origins; 17th-century houses at 22–24 Goodramgate; 30–32 Goodramgate, with parts dating from the 1380s; 38 and 40 Goodramgate, with 15th-century origins; and the Old White Swan, with a 16th-century core.

References

 
Streets in York